Kazakhstan participated in the 1998 Asian Games held in Bangkok, Thailand from December 6, 1998 to December 20, 1998. Athletes from Kazakhstan succeeded in winning 24 golds, 24 silvers and 30 bronzes, making total 78 medals. Kazakhstan finished fifth in a medal table, just one rank behind to host nation, Thailand.

References

Nations at the 1998 Asian Games
1998
Asian Games